The Speedway Grand Prix of Denmark is a speedway event that is a part of the Speedway Grand Prix Series.

The event was first held at the Vojens Speedway Center from 1995 to 2002 before switching to the Parken Stadium in Copenhagen from 2003 to 2014. After four years at the CASA Arena in Horsens between 2015 and 2018, the event will return to Vojens in 2019.

Winners

Most wins
 Tony Rickardsson and  Jason Crump both 4 times

See also 
 motorcycle speedway
 List of Speedway Grand Prix riders

References 

 
Denmark
International sports competitions hosted by Denmark
Grand Prix